The Orient is usually a historic term for the Eastern world (as contrasted with the Occident).

Orient or Oriental may also refer to:

History
 Ancient Orient, designation for the Ancient Near East
 Hellenistic Orient, designation for the Hellenistic Near East
 Roman Orient (disambiguation), designation for eastern regions of the Roman Empire, in particular:
 Diocese of the Orient, an administrative diocese in eastern parts of the Roman Empire
 Prefecture of the Orient, a praetorian prefecture in eastern parts of the Roman Empire
 Persian Orient, designation for territorial scope of several successive Persian Empires
 Ottoman Orient, designation for regions of the Ottoman Empire in the Near East

Places
 Orient, Queensland, Australia
 Oriente (province), a former province of Cuba
 L'Orient, a town in Brittany, France
 Oriental (municipality), Puebla, Mexico
 Oriental (Morocco)
 Negros Oriental, a province of the Philippines
 L'Orient, Switzerland

United States
Orient, Illinois
Orient, Iowa
Orient, Maine
Orient, New York
Orient Beach State Park
Orient Point, New York
Oriental, North Carolina
Orient, Ohio
Orient, Oregon
Orient, South Dakota
Orient, Texas
Orient, Washington
Orient Heights, a section of East Boston, Massachusetts
Orient Heights (MBTA station), a transit station
Orient Township, Michigan

Arts and entertainment
Orient (1924 film) (German title: Orient - Die Tochter der Wüste), a German silent film
Orient (1928 film) (German title: Frauenraub in Marokko), a German silent film
Orient (novel), a 2015 novel by Christopher Bollen
Orientalism (book), a 1978 book by Edward W. Said
Orient (manga), by Shinobu Ohtaka
Orient: A Hero's Heritage, a computer role-playing game
Henry Orient, a fictional character in the novel and film The World of Henry Orient
Oriental (Albéniz), a composition by Isaac Albéniz
Oriental music (disambiguation)

Business

Airlines
Air Orient, a former French airline
Filipinas Orient Airways, a former Philippines airline
Orient Airways (1946–1955), a former airline based in India
Orient Eagle Airways, a former Kazakh airline
Orient Thai Airlines, a former Thai airline

Banking
 China Orient Asset Management
 M Oriental Bank, formerly Oriental Commercial Bank Limited, a commercial bank in Kenya
 OFG Bancorp, or Oriental Bank, a financial holding company in San Juan, Puerto Rico
 Oriental Bank which merged with Consolidated National Bank of New York in 1909 to form National Reserve Bank
 Oriental Bank Corporation, a British imperial bank founded in India in 1842 
 Oriental Bank of Commerce, a former Indian public sector bank
 Oriental Bank PLC, or Oriental Bank, a commercial bank founded in Phnom Penh, Cambodia in 2021

Shipping
Orient Lines, a cruise line in operation 1993–2008
Orient Overseas Container Line, a Hong Kong-based container shipping company
Orient Steam Navigation Company (the "Orient Line"), a former British shipping company

Other Businesses
 Orient Bikes, a Greek bicycle manufacturer
 Orient Insurance, a major insurance company in Dubai, U.A.E. owned by Al-Futtaim Group
 Orient Paper Mills, located in India
 Orient Watch, a Japanese watch company
 South Orient Railroad a railroad line in West Texas

Masonic organizations
Grand Orient de France
Grand Orient of Switzerland
Grande Oriente do Brasil
Grand Orient du Congo
Grand Orient of Belgium
Grand Orient of Italy
Grand Orient of Luxembourg
Grand Orient of the Netherlands

Ships
Oriental, a sailing ship chartered by the New Zealand Company in 1839
French ship Orient, several ships
M/V Orient Queen, a Lebanese-owned cruise ship
Orient (sternwheeler), a steamboat in Oregon in the late 1800s
Orient (clipper ship), which traded between England and Adelaide from 1857 to 1877

Sports
Leyton Orient F.C., an English football club, often known just as "Orient"
FC Lorient, a French football club, known as Lorient

Other uses
Orient (automobile), an early American automobile
The Orient (newspaper), see Confiscation of Armenian properties in Turkey
Orient Hospital, a former Lebanese hospital
Orient House, headquarters of the PLO in East Jerusalem in the 1980s and '90s
El Oriental (born 1972), Mexican freestyle wrestler
Oriental (cat) or Oriental Shorthair, a breed of domestic cat
Oriental College, in Lahore, Punjab, Pakistan
Oriental tobacco
Oriental University, in Indore, Madhya Pradesh, India
Mongoloid, the "Oriental" race
The Bowdoin Orient, a student newspaper at Bowdoin College in the U.S. state of Maine
An alternative name for the natives of the República Oriental del Uruguay

See also
 Orient Express (disambiguation)
 Oriental dragon (disambiguation)
 Oriental Hotel (disambiguation)
 Oriental Institute (disambiguation)
 Oriental Pearl (disambiguation)
 Oriental Theatre (disambiguation)
 The Oriental (disambiguation)
 Oriente (disambiguation)